William Jarrel Cross (May 3, 1929 – July 5, 2013) was a professional American football player who played running back for three seasons for the Chicago Cardinals. He finished his career as an all-star in the Interprovincial Rugby Football Union with the Toronto Argonauts in 1954. He died in Canadian, Texas in 2013.

References

1929 births
2013 deaths
American football running backs
Chicago Cardinals players
Toronto Argonauts players
West Texas A&M Buffaloes football players
People from Brown County, Texas
Players of American football from Texas